Agios Isidoros is a village in the municipal unit of Plomari, Lesbos Island, Greece. It is located just two kilometers outside the town of Plomari, South Lesbos. It has a pebbled beach which is one of the longest in Lesbos and voted as the 7th best beach in Greece due to the safety provided, the clean water and care for the environment.

External links
 Travel Guide About Agios Isidoros

Populated places in Lesbos